Nine steamships have been named SS Milwaukee (or derivation).

 SS Milwaukee (1852), U.S. package freighter.
 SS Milwaukee (1868), U.S. steam barge.
 SS Milwaukee (1879), also known as Yonkers,  U.S. package freighter.
 SS Milwaukee (1889), U.S. tugboat.
 SS Milwaukee (1902), U.S. package freighter.
  (1931), U.S. ferry.

See also
 
 , a German transatlantic cruise ship of the Hamburg-America Line. As spoils of war, it entered British service in 1945 as Empire Waveney.

References

Ship names